Dorket Head is the name of the immediate area surrounding the junction of Lime Lane and Calverton  Road in the town of Arnold, Nottinghamshire.

Toponymy
Mentions before that time refer to variations of 'Dalegate', so it appears as Dalegate in an early 13th century charter in the British Museum, Dalgate-heved in the Rufford Cartulary and Dallegate hevedgrene in the 1602 Wollaton Forest Book.

This is a Scandinavian place-name from the Old Norse  dalr , 'valley' and   gata , 'road', which references the road which runs up the valley here from Arnold towards Calverton, and 'head' meaning the uppermost or furthermost portion of a valley.

Archaeology
From 1973 to 1991, in excavations at Dorket Head and Cockpit Hill (in Ramsdale Park to the north), the Sherwood Archaeological Society uncovered apparent  Roman fortification ditches and also Late Bronze Age/Early Iron Age pottery, together with Late Iron Age pottery.

Other
FCC Environment has a landfill site at Dorket Head.  Opened in 1993, it has planning permission for the disposal of non-hazardous waste and is a part of Nottinghamshire County Council's 'Waste Core Strategy' plan for dealing with the county's waste. Around  of electricity is generated every day at Dorket Head from burning the gas which is produced as the waste degrades and breaks down.
The Ibstock Brick Company, which quarries clay for use in the manufacture of bricks, is also at the site. Once quarrying has finished in an area of the site, it is used for landfill.

Footnotes

Geography of Nottinghamshire
Gedling